The Columbia station, also known as Missouri, Kansas, and Texas Railroad Depot or Katy Station, was built in 1909 by the Missouri–Kansas–Texas Railroad in downtown Columbia, Missouri.  The station was one of two train stations serving Columbia in the 20th century, the other being the Wabash Railroad Station and Freight House constructed the same year.  The building  is the terminus of the MKT Trail, a rails-to-trails project that was built on the former spur of the railroad.   Having housed a popular local restaurant named "Katy Station" after the building, it now houses a bar name "Shiloh's."

The property was listed on the National Register of Historic Places in 1979.

References

Railway stations on the National Register of Historic Places in Missouri
Former Missouri–Kansas–Texas Railroad stations
Railway stations in the United States opened in 1909
Rail transportation in Columbia, Missouri
Buildings and structures in Columbia, Missouri
National Register of Historic Places in Boone County, Missouri
Former railway stations in Missouri
1909 establishments in Missouri